Rauno Roosnurm (born 21 February 1991), known professionally as Mord Fustang, is an Estonian DJ and music producer. He is regarded as a pioneer in the complextro genre.

Career 
Rauno Roosnurm was born in Kose and is based in Tallinn.

In 2011, he released multiple singles on the record label, Plasmapool, such as "The Electric Dream" with Milky Way, "Super Meat Freeze" and "Lick the Rainbow". He gained recognition for remixing singles by artists such as LMFAO. His song "A New World" was featured in a British breakfast commercial. He debuted at the 2011 Ultra Music Festival in Miami.

In March 2012, Mord Fustang was selected as the Breakthrough Artist of the Year at the fifth annual Beatport Music Awards ceremony. He performed at the 2012 Ultra Music Festival. He released a four-song EP titled "Welcome to the Future". He went on the Plasma Pool Tour 2012. His music was featured in the Forza Horizon soundtrack. His music was also an optional music track offered in Counter-Strike: Global Offensive.

In 2015, he released his debut studio album titled 9999 in 1 via his own label Magic Trooper. He described it as a 'concept album'. He was approached by Mau5trap and was subsequently signed to the label. He debuted on Mau5trap with an extended play titled "Murmurs".

In a tweet and Facebook post in May 2021, Mord Fustang stated that he is not affiliated with Plasmapool, citing misrepresentation. He asked fans to not buy or stream from the label due to them being "abusive, manipulative, [lying] to their artists and [using] dirty tricks" to keep artists with them, and stating they had been "dragging classic tracks through the mud for years, using outdated artwork, pushing un-approved releases", and encouraged listeners to pirate his music to get around the label. A track list was posted on in June 2021 detailing the songs he wished were no longer affiliated with Plasmapool.

Discography

Albums

Extended plays

Singles 
2011
 "The Electric Dream" [Plasmapool]
 "Super Meat Freeze" [Plasmapool]
 "Milky Way" [Plasmapool]
 "Lick The Rainbow" [Plasmapool]
 "A New World" [NOIZE]
 "Magic Trooper" [Plasmapool]
 "We Are Now Connected" [Plasmapool]

2012
 "Champloo" [Plasmapool]

2013
 "Taito" [Plasmapool]
 "Magic Trooper (Jp.Moa Remix)" [Houserecordings]
 "Something Right Meow" [Plasmapool]
 "If You Want" [Plasmapool]

2014
 "Drivel" [Magic Trooper]
 "Pop" [Magic Trooper]
 "Doppelgangbanger" [Magic Trooper]

2015
 "Pop (ST4RBUCK Remix)" [Magic Trooper]

2016
 "We Are" (with Lazy Rich) [Big & Dirty Recordings]
 "Tonight" [Dawn of Light]
 "Eminate (Extended Cut)" [Dawn of Light]
 "Arcade Disc_" [Dawn of Light]

2017
 "Diamonds" [Dawn of Light]
 "Because of You" [Plasmapool]
 "Happy Day At the Zoo" [Plasmapool]

2018
 "VRES" [Plasmapool]
 "Sorbet" [Plasmapool]
 "Cyberflunk" [Plasmapool]
 "Fabricated" [Dawn of Light]
 "Gaia" [Dawn of Light]
"Elixia" [Beat Saber (Original Game Soundtrack), Vol. II – EP]
 "I'm a Voyager" [Dawn of Light]
 "Adieu" [Dawn of Light]
 "Spiked Soda" [Dawn of Light]

2019
 "Frick Datt" [Dawn of Light]
 "Further" [Dawn of Light]
 "The Drifter" [Dawn of Light]
 "Keystones" [Dawn of Light]
 "Mind Out of Sequence" [Dawn of Light]
 "Megalomania" [Dawn of Light]
 "Some Girls" [Dawn of Light]
 "I Drown in You VIP" [Dawn of Light]
 "Strawberry Mountain" [Dawn of Light]
 "Pray" [Dawn of Light]
 "Another Place to Fall" [Dawn of Light]

2020

 "Unassembled" [Dawn of Light]
 "Kindred" [Dawn of Light]
 "Moonstone" [Dawn of Light]
 "Another Earth" [Dawn of Light]
 "C'EST LE BON" [Dawn of Light]
 "Fantôme" [Dawn of Light]
 "Joanna" [Dawn of Light]
 "Cyphers" [Dawn of Light]
 "Carousel" [Dawn of Light]

Remixes 
2011
 Fussy Boy — "Gold" (Mord Fustang Remix) [Plasmapool]
 Morgan Page, Sultan & Ned Shepard and BT featuring Angela McCluskey — "In The Air" (Mord Fustang Remix) [Nettwerk]
 LMFAO — "Sexy And I Know It" (Mord Fustang Remix) [Foo & Blu]
 Froidz — "Finally" (Mord Fustang Remix) [Yawa Recordings]

2015
 The Glitch Mob — "Carry The Sun" (Mord Fustang Remix) [Glass Air]

2019
 Mord Fustang — "I Drown in You VIP" [Dawn of Light]

2020
 Midnight Kids — "Last Time" (Mord Fustang Remix) [RCA Records]

References

External links 

Living people
Musicians from Tallinn
Estonian record producers
Estonian DJs
Mau5trap artists
People from Kose Parish
1991 births